Miersia is a plant genus in the Amaryllidaceae. All 5 known species are native to Chile and Bolivia.

The genus name of Miersia is in honour of John Miers (1789–1879), a British botanist and engineer, best known for his work on the flora of Chile and Argentina.

Species
 Miersia chilensis Lindl.
 Miersia leporina   Ravenna
 Miersia myodes Bertero
 Miersia rusbyi Britton
 Miersia tenuiseta Ravenna

Kew also accepts, Miersia triloba  (from Chile).

References

Amaryllidaceae genera
Allioideae
Plants described in 1826
Flora of Chile
Flora of Bolivia